Shammy Dab is a Scottish comedy panel game show that aired on Grampian Television from 8 January 1985 to 1 June 1989.

History
Shammy Dab was created in 1975 by Bill Torrance as part of a series for Radio Forth in Edinburgh entitled Fair Flummoxed. The radio version mainly featured Scottish country dance bands.

The name was changed to 'Shammy Dab' (referring to a cheap wall decoration where a wall was stippled with a wet sponge - when done well, it was said to be a shammy dab).

Transmissions
In later years, the series was also aired on Border Television and Scottish Television.

References

External links
 

1985 Scottish television series debuts
1989 Scottish television series endings
1980s British game shows
1980s Scottish television series
English-language television shows
ITV game shows
Television shows produced by Grampian Television